Joseph Shinn House is located in Woodstown, Salem County, New Jersey. The house was built in 1742 and was added to the National Register of Historic Places on March 7, 1979, for its significance in architecture and politics/government.

History
The house was built by Samuel Shivers in 1742, and then inherited by his son-in-law Joseph Shinn. The northern third of the house was built in 1812.

Shinn was a member the fifth session (June–August 1776) of the Provincial Congress of New Jersey which ordered the arrest of the colony's last royal governor William Franklin, approved the Declaration of Independence and wrote New Jersey's first state constitution (1776).

Joseph's son, General of the New Jersey militia Isaiah Shinn, later owned the house, but built another house across the street in 1790.  Both of these houses are located in the local Woodstown Historic District along with another nearby house, the William Shinn House.  Isaiah's grandson, painter Everett Shinn was raised in Woodstown but never lived in the Joseph Shinn House.

See also
National Register of Historic Places listings in Salem County, New Jersey
 List of the oldest buildings in New Jersey

References

External links
Real estate photos

Georgian architecture in New Jersey
Houses on the National Register of Historic Places in New Jersey
Houses completed in 1742
Houses in Salem County, New Jersey
National Register of Historic Places in Salem County, New Jersey
1742 establishments in New Jersey
New Jersey Register of Historic Places
Woodstown, New Jersey